The 1918 Western Reserve football team represented Western Reserve University—now known as Case Western Reserve University, during the 1918 college football season. The team's coach was Frank A. Yocum. Originally  was on the schedule, but due to the Spanish flu, Oberlin College was played a second time to fill the cancellation.  The Michigan Agricultural game was cancelled due to the team having to go into quarantine.

Schedule

References

Western Reserve
Case Western Reserve Spartans football seasons
Western Reserve football